The 1992 Ballon d'Or, given to the best football player in Europe as judged by a panel of sports journalists from UEFA member countries, was awarded to Marco van Basten on 22 December 1992.

Rankings

References

External links
 France Football Official Ballon d'Or page

1992
1992–93 in European football